Shawn Vedaa (born September 17, 1966) is an American politician who has served in the North Dakota Senate from the 6th district since 2016. Vedaa is a past member of the U.S. National Guard and is married with 5 children.

References

1966 births
Living people
Republican Party North Dakota state senators
People from Mountrail County, North Dakota
21st-century American politicians